Pastitsada is a Greek dish consisting of pasta topped with meat braised in a spicy tomato-based sauce. Often associated with the island of Corfu, where it is a traditional Sunday dinner, it is sometimes called pastitsada Korfiatiki.

The name comes from the Venetian  (standard Italian ) lit. 'something messed up', which is used for a large variety of Italian braised meat dishes, generally served with polenta, mashed potatoes, or pasta.

Pastitsada is based on veal, beef or poultry cooked in fresh or canned tomatoes, olive oil, minced onions, garlic, salt, black pepper, white wine, vinegar, cloves, bay leaf, cinnamon, butter and served over pasta. It is usually topped with  grated kefalotyri or Parmesan cheese. The dish shows Italian influence.

Notes

Cuisine of the Ionian Islands
Greek cuisine
Greek stews